Grevillea tetrapleura is a shrub of the genus Grevillea native to an area in the  Goldfields-Esperance region of Western Australia.

Description
It blooms between July and September and produces an axillary raceme irregular inflorescence with pink flowers and pink styles.

Taxonomy
The species was first formally described by the botanist Donald McGillivray in 1986 as a part of the work New Names in Grevillea (Proteaceae).

Distribution
The shrub is found in an area centred around Southern Cross from north of Mukinbudin in the west to the Mount Manning Nature Reserve in the north and to around Yellowdine in the south east. It is often situated among granite outcrops growing in sandy to sandy loam soils.

See also
 List of Grevillea species

References

tetrapleura
Proteales of Australia
Eudicots of Western Australia
Taxa named by Donald McGillivray